Mary Ekpere-Eta is a Nigerian barrister and activist. She is Director General of the National Centre for Women Development (NCWD) in Abuja.

Life
Mary Eta is a lawyer, farmer and fellow of the Chartered Institute of Taxation of Nigeria. In 2012 she made a bid to become Governor of Cross River State. She is a representative of  South-South women on the board of trustees of the All Progressives Congress (APC).

President Buhari appointed Ekpere-Eta as Director General of NCWD in April 2017.

References

External links
 Profile of Director General, National Centre for Women Development, Abuja

Year of birth missing (living people)
Living people
Nigerian women lawyers
Nigerian women's rights activists
21st-century Nigerian lawyers